Gabbla is a 2009 film.

Synopsis 
Despite practically living as a recluse far from the maddening world, Malek, a forty-year-old topographer, accepts a job to the West of Algeria. A company in Oran entrusts him with the layout of the new electrical line that will bring power to the hamlets in the Ouarsenis Massif, an area that lived under the whip of radical Islamism until barely ten years ago. After several hours on the road, Malek reaches the base camp. While he starts putting things in order, he discovers a young woman hidden in a corner.

Awards 
 Venice Film Festival 2008

External links 

 

2008 films
Algerian drama films
French drama films
2000s French films